Lango sub-region is a region in Uganda covering an area of 15,570.7km consisting of the districts of:

Alebtong 
Amolatar 
Apac 
Dokolo 
Kole 
Lira 
Oyam 
Otuke 
Kwania 

It covers the area previously known as Lango District until 1974, when it was split into the districts of Apac and Lira, and subsequently into several other districts. The sub-region is home mainly to the Lango ethnic group. 

At the 2002 national census, it had a population of about 1.5 million people. As of July 2018, its population was an estimated 2.3 million, about 5.75% of the estimated 40 million Ugandans at the time.

See also
 Districts of Uganda

References

External links

 Political Climate In Lango Sub-region

 
Sub-regions of Uganda
Northern Region, Uganda